Radulf or Radulph  may refer to:

Radulf, King of Thuringia, 7th-century noble, Duke and then King
Radulf II, Duke of Thuringia, 9th century
Radulf of Narbonne, 8th-century Count
Radulf of Besalú (died 920), Count
Radulf (d. 1220), Radulf II, abbot of Kinloss
Radulf of Brechin, 13th-century bishop of Brechin
Radulf the Cistercian, 12th-century French monk who called for the killing of Jews

See also
 Ralph (disambiguation)
 Rudolph (disambiguation)
 List of rulers of Thuringia